The 1961 Oklahoma State Cowboys baseball team represented Oklahoma State University–Stillwater in the 1961 NCAA University Division baseball season. The Cowboys played their home games at Allie P. Reynolds Stadium in Stillwater, Oklahoma. The team was coached by Toby Greene in his eighteenth season at Oklahoma State.

The Cowboys reached the College World Series, finishing as the runner up to Southern California.

Roster

Schedule

References 

Oklahoma State
Oklahoma State Cowboys baseball seasons
College World Series seasons
Big Eight Conference baseball champion seasons